The China men's national under-19 volleyball team represents China in men's under-19 volleyball Events, it is controlled and managed by the Chinese Volleyball Association that is a member of Asian volleyball body Asian Volleyball Confederation (AVC) and the international volleyball body government the Fédération Internationale de Volleyball (FIVB).

Results

Summer Youth Olympics
 Champions   Runners up   Third place   Fourth place

FIVB U19 World Championship
 Champions   Runners up   Third place   Fourth place

Team

2015 world championship Squad

The following is the Chinese roster in the 2015 FIVB Volleyball Boys' U19 World Championship.

Head Coach: Jun Gu

Notable players

References

External links
Official website

U
National men's under-19 volleyball teams
Volleyball in China